Richard Parry (born 22 December 1942) is an English saxophonist. He has appeared as a session musician on various albums, most notably in solo parts on the Pink Floyd songs "Money", "Us and Them", "Shine On You Crazy Diamond" and "Wearing the Inside Out". He also played on the Bloodstone album Riddle of the Sphinx.

Career 
Born in Kentford, Suffolk, Parry started his career as a saxophonist in The Soul Committee, a mid-1960s band in Cambridge.  He was a friend of Pink Floyd guitarist David Gilmour who played in Jokers Wild, another band in Cambridge.  Contrary to some reports, Parry did not play in Jokers Wild. Some years later, Gilmour asked him to play on Pink Floyd studio albums, including The Dark Side of the Moon, Wish You Were Here, and The Division Bell, as well as in every Pink Floyd live performance between 1973 and 1977, and the 1994 world tour. He also toured as part of the Who's brass section on their 1979–1980 tours.

He played saxophone on "Celestine" for the 1997 album Big Men Cry by Banco de Gaia.

Parry appeared on Gilmour's live dates in 2001 and 2002, one performance of which was released as David Gilmour in Concert. He also played on the 2006 On An Island tour in Europe, the United States and Canada, performing saxophone on "Shine On You Crazy Diamond", "Wearing the Inside Out", and "Then I Close My Eyes". Shows from the Royal Albert Hall in London, and from the Shipyard in Gdańsk, Poland were released as the DVDs Remember That Night and Live in Gdańsk, respectively.

He appeared at the Pink Floyd reunion at Live 8, where he played his saxophone part on "Money". In 2009, he toured Europe and South Africa with the Violent Femmes.

Selected discography as saxophonist

 1970: J. J. Jackson's Dilemma – J. J. Jackson
 1970: ...and proud of it! – J.J. Jackson
 1971: Quiver – Quiver
 1971: Bring It Back Home – Mike Vernon with Rory Gallagher and Pete Wingfield
 1972: Let's Make Up and Be Friendly – Bonzo Dog Doo-Dah Band
 1972: Transatlantic – Jimmy Dawkins
 1972: Mick the Lad – Mick Grabham (Procol Harum)
 1972: London Gumbo – Lightnin' Slim
 1973: The Dark Side of the Moon – Pink Floyd (on "Money" and "Us and Them")
 1973: I'm the Worst Partner I Know – Kazimierz Lux
 1973: Urban Cowboy – Andy Roberts (on the track "Elaine")
 1974: First of the Big Bands – Tony Ashton and Jon Lord
 1974: Riddle of the Sphinx – Bloodstone
 1975: Wish You Were Here – Pink Floyd (on "Shine On You Crazy Diamond (Part V)")
 1975: Mad Dog – John Entwistle (The Who)
 1975: Live 1971–1975 – Les Humphries Singers
 1975: Love Is a Five Letter Word – Jimmy Witherspoon
 1975: Fingertips – Duster Bennett
 1982: Jinx – Rory Gallagher
 1993: BBC Radio One Live in Concert – Paice Ashton Lord
 1994: The Division Bell – Pink Floyd ("Wearing the Inside Out")
 1995: Pulse – Pink Floyd
 1998: Big Men Cry – Banco de Gaia (on the track "Celestine")
 2002: David Gilmour in Concert – David Gilmour (Pink Floyd) – DVD
2007: Remember That Night - David Gilmour (Pink Floyd) - DVD (Parry also played additional keyboards)
2008: Live in Gdańsk - David Gilmour (Pink Floyd) - DVD (Parry also played the glass harmonica and additional keyboards)
 2008: Duchess – Deborah Bonham
 2023: The Dark Side of the Moon Live at Wembley 1974 – Pink Floyd

References

1942 births
Living people
English rock saxophonists
British male saxophonists
21st-century saxophonists
21st-century British male musicians
Jokers Wild (band) members